Hakea bicornata is a shrub in the family Proteaceae native to Western Australia, with attractive creamy-white flowers and fruit with two distinctive horns.

Description
The many smaller branches are rusty coloured and covered with small hairs. The young leaves are densely covered in matted silky hairs but become smooth as they mature. It produces cream-white to yellow flowers from April to May and occasionally August. Each inflorescence is composed of eight cream-white to yellow flowers on an obscure stem.
The fruit are pale grey with black blister-like protuberances. The dark brown to black egg-shaped seeds have a wing down one side.

Taxonomy and naming
Hakea bicornata was first formally described by botanist R.M.Barker in 1990 as part of the work New species, new combinations and other name changes in Hakea (Proteaceae) as published in Journal of the Adelaide Botanic Gardens. The specific epithet (bicornata) is derived from the Latin prefix bi- meaning "two" or "twice" and the word cornu meaning "horn", referring to the prominent horns on the fruit.

Distribution and habitat
Hakea bicornata is found in coastal areas along the south coast Goldfields-Esperance region of Western Australia between Esperance and Cape Arid National Park in lateritic sandy-loamy soils over granite as part of shrub-land communities.

Conservation status
Hakea bicornata is classified as "not threatened" by the Western Australian Government Department of Parks and Wildlife.

References

bicornata
Eudicots of Western Australia
Plants described in 1990
Taxa named by Robyn Mary Barker